Broadmarsh is a rural locality and town in the local government areas of Southern Midlands and Derwent Valley in the Central and South-east regions of Tasmania. The 2016 census determined a population of 167 for the state suburb of Broadmarsh.

History
Broadmarsh was gazetted as a locality in 1970. The name was used for a farm in the area in 1836.

Geography
The Jordan River flows through from north to south-east.

Road infrastructure
The C185 route (Elderslie Road) enters from the north and runs through via the town to the south-east, where it exits. Route C186 (Black Brush Road) starts at an intersection with C185 and runs north-east until it exits.

References

Localities of Southern Midlands Council
Localities of Derwent Valley Council
Towns in Tasmania